Jungnau is a village in the district of Sigmaringen in Baden-Württemberg in Germany. It is part of the City Sigmaringen.

Towns in Baden-Württemberg
Sigmaringen (district)